Ronald Leonard Easterbrook (11 May 1931 – 10 May 2009) was a convicted armed robber and self-confessed career criminal.   Easterbrook is most notable for going on hunger strike in protest over his conviction for an armed robbery in Woolwich in November 1987 in which fellow armed robber Anthony Ash was shot dead by police.

Early life

Ronald Leonard Easterbrook, better known as Ronnie Easterbrook, was born in Deptford on 11 May 1931, the son of William Henry Easterbrook and Caroline Pegg. On the 1911 census, Easterbrook's father, William is described as a "Carman", the driver of a goods vehicle or horse-drawn cart. Ronald was born into a straight working-class family and grew up in Deptford, he was one of the youngest of 11 children.

When he left school at the age of 14, Easterbrook got a job working on tipper lorries earning £2 10s a week but he soon found that he wasn't able to live on this wage and was constantly borrowing money; it was then that he got into crime. In between working as a general labourer or on building sites, Easterbrook carried out petty crimes, breaking, entering and burglaries. Easterbrook received his first conviction in 1946 when he was aged 15.

Borstal

In 1949, Ronald Easterbrook spent some time at Hewell Grange. At that time, Hewell Grange was a borstal, until 1991 when it became a category D prison. In Ron Farquhar's autobiography, A Journey of Awakening, Farquhar writes how he met Ron Easterbrook whilst at the borstal. Farquhar was working in the Army Cadet Officer's club. When he was tidying up at the end of the day, he would take any leftover cakes to Easterbrook who was working as a stoker in the boiler room.

Early crimes

Some of the crimes that Easterbrook was involved with are recorded in newspapers of the day. The Evening Times reports a conviction for wounding William Mills and Frank Henry Dunn with intent to cause them grievous bodily harm by jabbing them in the face with a broken glass.

The Evening Times reports in a later story, three counts of breaking and entering. One of these alleges that Easterbrook broke into the Artillery Museum, which at the time was located at the Rotunda in Woolwich and stole six firearms valued at £81 that were the property of the Queen.

The Glasgow Herald reports a conviction for receiving stolen goods, a stolen hat and overcoat.

An article in Police Review reports Easterbrook as having a conviction for assaulting a policeman with a lead-loaded rubber hose and another conviction for stabbing a man with a carving knife.

Bickley burglary

Easterbrook's first conviction for armed robbery came in 1958, whilst he was working as a bricklayer and living in Holden House, Church Street, Deptford.

At around 8.00pm, on 29 March 1958, Easterbrook, who was armed with a gun, was burgling a house in Bickley in the London Borough of Bromley. Police had been alerted to the burglary and dispatched PC Henry Stevens to investigate. Stevens spotted Easterbrook climbing over a wooden fence and gave chase along St. Georges Road, Bickley. As Stevens was gaining on Easterbrook, Easterbrook turned and pointed a gun before saying "Stop, or you'll get this". Ignoring the warning, Stevens continued the chase and Easterbrook opened fire, shooting Stevens in the face.

The .22 calibre bullet ricocheted off Stevens teeth before embedding itself in his tongue. Despite having been shot, Stevens managed to grab hold of Easterbrook and force him up against some iron railings at the side of a railway bridge. During the struggle, the constable managed to twist the gun from Easterbrook's hand, but Easterbrook managed to pull free. Stevens then grabbed out and managed to grab hold of the back of Easterbrook's overcoat. Easterbrook who was still running with the constable being dragged behind, suddenly slipped off his overcoat and jacket causing Stevens to fall to the ground. Easterbrook then escaped over the railway bridge.

The coat and jacket were later used to help identify Easterbrook. The officer, PC Henry Stevens was also able to identify Easterbrook from photographs shown to him whilst he was in hospital.

The case was heard at the Old Bailey and on 13 May 1958. Easterbrook was initially charged with attempted murder but was acquitted due to lack of evidence that he actually intended to kill PC Stevens. Easterbrook was instead convicted of the lesser charge of grievous bodily harm and intent to resist his lawful apprehension. He was sentenced to 10 years.

In summing up, judge Mr. Justice Ashworth said "You are in my view a wicked and dangerous man".

PC Henry Stevens was later awarded the George Cross for gallantry during this event.

Criminal record

Ronald Easterbrook received two further convictions. The first was in 1968, when he carried out a robbery armed with a pistol and a sawn off shotgun. He received a 13-year sentence. On his release in 1981 he was convicted of conspiracy to rob security guards of £40,000 and possessing an automatic pistol with intent to commit an indictable offence. He was sentenced to 3 years.

The Woolwich robbery

In November 1987, Easterbrook was involved in the robbery of wages from a Bejam supermarket in Woolwich. The store, located in Hare Street, was the target of the robbery and the plan was to rob the store with fellow armed robber Tony Ash and getaway driver Gary Wilson waiting to drive to another location and then swap cars.

The robbery itself was carried out by Tony Ash entering the store and holding a loaded revolver to the shop assistant's head before demanding they hand over a Securicor cash bag containing £10,400. Ron Easterbrook, who was also armed with a revolver, kept watch outside. Following the robbery both men fled the scene and drove to the swapover point in Sunbury Street about a mile away.

The police, who had been tipped off about the robbery, were lying in wait at the swapover point to ambush. Gunshots were exchanged in the street in front of Woolwich Fire Station. During the gun battle, Tony Ash was shot dead by police.  Easterbrook fired six shots from a revolver, one of which hit a police officer, Inspector Dwight Atkinson, in the leg. Both Easterbrook and Wilson were wounded by police bullets and then immediately arrested.

The event was captured on film by a television film crew from Thames Television who were filming for the documentary series Flying Squad and footage from the scene was broadcast in 1989. Footage of the arrest is also shown in the 2010 documentary series Flying Squad: The Real Sweeney, shown on National Geographic Channel.

Trial and conviction

Following the Woolwich raid, Easterbrook appeared in court. For his defence, Easterbrook instructed his barrister to claim that Flying Squad officers were operating a shoot-to-kill policy. Easterbrook claimed that the officers had opened fire first and he had only returned fire in self-defence. Despite wanting to put forward this defence, his barrister refused to do so because the defence was political in nature. Easterbrook then chose to defend himself.

On 30 November 1988, Easterbrook was convicted at the Central Criminal Court in London, of robbery, wounding with intent, possessing firearms with intent to endanger life and possessing ammunition with intent to endanger life. He was sentenced to life imprisonment. It was the first time an armed robber had received a whole life sentence.

Appeal

Ronald Easterbrook always maintained that his arrest had been a set up between the police and a police informant, later named as Seamus Rae. Easterbrook also believed that the police had operated a shoot-to-kill policy. Easterbrook maintains that robber Tony Ash had been trying to give himself up when he was shot dead. Easterbrook's solicitor had refused to put forward this defence because it was deemed too political. Easterbrook believed that since he had not been able to put forward this defence and did not have legal counsel, he had not received a fair trial.

In June 1990, the Court of Appeal refused Easterbrook's application for leave to appeal against his conviction. The court of appeal also rejected his appeal against his sentence. During the hearing, Easterbrook was not represented by any legal counsel.

On 9 December 1992, a certificate was issued on behalf the Secretary of State informing Easterbrook that his release would be at the discretion of the Home Secretary following a favourable recommendation by a parole board and after consultation with the Lord Chief Justice. The Home Office policy at the time was that no life prisoner would be detained more than 17 years without a review from the parole board. The first review of his case would therefore be in November 2004.

Later in 1995, Easterbrook was being held in the segregation unit of HMP Whitemoor after beginning a dirty protest against his conviction. In 1997, Easterbrook refused to eat solids for nine months marking his first hunger strike.

On 5 February 1998, the Home Secretary agreed to certify that Easterbrook be subject to the arrangements of discretionary life prisoners and his tariff was reduced to 16 years, after a further application this was reduced to 12½ years by the Home Secretary and the Lord Chief Justice and would expire in May 2000.

In November 1999, Easterbrook began his second hunger strike which lasted for three months.

When Easterbrook's tariff expired in May 2000, he became eligible for parole but he refused to take part in the parole process due to his belief that the Crown had breached his human rights and that he had not received a fair trial by not being allowed to put forward a political defence.

In 2003, whilst at HMP High Down in Surrey, Easterbrook through his solicitor, Simon Creighton, took the case to the European Court of Human Rights in Strasbourg. The European Court of Human Rights ruled that Easterbrook's tariff fixing procedure had been in breach of article six of the convention. The court also ruled that the delay in fixing Easterbrook's tariff breached articles four and five of the convention.

Despite this ruling by the European Court of Human Rights, Easterbrook still refused to take part in the parole process and remained in prison until 2009 where he died, still claiming that his conviction was unlawful. The decisions made by the European Court of Human Rights in the case of Ronald Easterbook have had a direct result on the setting of tariffs for convicted criminals.

References

External links
 Regina v Home Secretary ex parte Easterbrook (1999) 
 Easterbrook vs. The United Kingdom, European Court of Human Rights, 2003

1931 births
2009 deaths
British robbers
People who died on hunger strike